Fredrik Aursnes (born 10 December 1995) is a Norwegian professional footballer who plays as a midfielder for Primeira Liga club Benfica and the Norway national team.

Club career

Early career
Aursnes played youth football for Hareid, before joining Hødd before the 2012 season. He made his senior league debut in April 2012 in a 2–1 win against Bodø/Glimt. Aged 16 years and 350 days, he became the all-time youngest winner and youngest finalist of the Norwegian Cup after Hødd's win against Tromsø IL in the final.

Molde
In December 2015, Aursnes joined Molde on a four-year deal. He debuted on 18 February 2016 against Sevilla in the UEFA Europa League round of 32, first leg. On 22 April 2019, Aursnes got his 100th first-team appearance for the club in their 2–0 away win against Lillestrøm. On 30 April 2019, Aursnes signed a two-year contract extension that ties him to Molde until the end of the 2021 season. On 11 July 2019, he scored Molde's second goal in the club's UEFA competitions record 7–1 win over KR in the UEFA Europa League first qualifying round.

Feyenoord
On 8 August 2021, following their 5–4 victory over Haugesund, Molde announced that Aursnes had been sold to Feyenoord. On 10 August 2021, Aursnes signed a three-year contract at the club. He scored his first goal for Feyenoord against SC Cambuur, in a 3–2 victory on 24 October 2021.

Benfica
On 24 August 2022, Aursnes signed a five-year contract with Primeira Liga side Benfica, for a reported fee of €13 million plus €2 million in add-ons. He made his debut for the club on 27 August, replacing Enzo Fernández in the 90th minute in a 3–0 away win over Boavista in the Primeira Liga.

International career
Aursnes made his debut for Norway national team on 6 June 2021 in a friendly against Greece. He substituted Patrick Berg in the 69th minute.

Career statistics

Club

Honours
Hødd
Norwegian Cup: 2012

Molde
Eliteserien: 2019

Feyenoord
 UEFA Europa Conference League runner-up: 2021–22

References

External links

 Profile at the S.L. Benfica website

1995 births
People from Hareid
Sportspeople from Møre og Romsdal
Living people
Norwegian footballers
Association football midfielders
Norway international footballers
Norway youth international footballers
Norway under-21 international footballers
IL Hødd players
Molde FK players
Feyenoord players
S.L. Benfica footballers
Norwegian First Division players
Eliteserien players
Eredivisie players
Primeira Liga players
Norwegian expatriate footballers
Expatriate footballers in the Netherlands
Norwegian expatriate sportspeople in the Netherlands
Expatriate footballers in Portugal
Norwegian expatriate sportspeople in Portugal